Popsy may refer to:

 "Popsy" (short story), by Stephen King
 Popsy (horse) (born 1990), Thoroughbred racehorse who won the New Zealand Derby in 1993
 Popsy (missile), a British Navy concept for a short-range anti-aircraft missile
 Nickname of C. M. Payne (1873–1964), American cartoonist best known for his comic strip S'Matter, Pop?
 Popsy Dixon, a member of the American music trio The Holmes Brothers
 Ershad Moinuddin Popsy, original drummer of the Bangladeshi band Feedback
 "Popsy", a track from the 1966 album Happiness Is by Ray Coniff
 Popsy, a character in the 1993–2000 TV sitcom Oki Doki Doc
 "Popsy", the dominant woman in a relationship between female prisoners – see Prison sexuality